Behaviour is the sixth studio album by the Canadian progressive rock band Saga, and was originally released in 1985, two years after the moderately successful Heads or Tales. Behaviour was itself successful, and managed to outsell its 1983 predecessor thanks to the strong performance of the single "What Do I Know?".

The album contains singer Michael Sadler's most personal song, "(Goodbye) Once Upon a Time", which he said was written about his late father and which still brought up strong emotions when performed years after the album's release.

Changes and band break-up
The 1985 album was a marked departure for the band as Saga moved on from working with Rupert Hine, who had produced the band's last two albums and helped to land the band commercial success during the early part of that decade. There was an overhaul of both the sounds and styles incorporated by the band during the development of the new album, leading Saga to produce a more pop-oriented sound than their previous progressive rock works.

These changes caused tensions within the band during the production. After the album was released, singer Michael Sadler informed drummer Steve Negus and Jim Gilmour that they were no longer welcome in the band, beginning a rift in the band that lasted until 1991. Speaking in interviews during 2002, at the time the band members regarded this division as only temporary and felt the five members would eventually be reunited.

Track listing

Personnel
Saga
 Michael Sadler - lead vocals, keyboards
 Jim Crichton - bass guitar, keyboards
 Jim Gilmour - keyboards, backing vocals
 Ian Crichton - guitar
 Steve Negus - drums, percussion, electronic percussion

Production
 Sharon Benson - Additional vocals on "What Do I Know?"
 Produced by Saga and Peter Walsh
 Engineered by Peter Walsh
 Mastered at Sterling Sound by Jack Skinner
 Recorded at Compass Point Studios, Nassau, Powerplay Recording Studios, Zurich & Union Studios, Munich
 Sleeve Design - Studio Convertino, Milan
 Photographer - Fred Ereissing

References

1985 albums
Saga (band) albums
Portrait Records albums